Calumet (  or  ) is a village in Calumet Township, Houghton County, in the U.S. state of Michigan's Upper Peninsula, that was once at the center of the mining industry of the Upper Peninsula. Also known as Red Jacket, the village includes the Calumet Downtown Historic District, listed on the National Register of Historic Places (NRHP). The village may itself be included within the Calumet Historic District, a larger area which is NRHP-listed and which is a National Historic Landmark District. It is bordered on the north by Calumet Township, on the south by Newtown and Calumet Township, on the east by Blue Jacket and Calumet Township, and on the west by Yellow Jacket and Calumet Township. The population was 621 at the 2020 census. Calumet's nickname is Copper Town U.S.A.

History 

What is now Calumet was settled in 1864, originally under the name of "Red Jacket", named for a Native American Chief of the Seneca tribe. Until 1895 the name "Calumet" was used by the nearby town of Laurium, Michigan; present-day Calumet was not legally named so until 1929.

Red Jacket grew due to the copper mines in the area. It was incorporated as a town in 1867. The copper mines were particularly rich; the Boston-based Calumet and Hecla Mining Company otherwise produced more than half of the United States' copper from 1871 through 1880.  In addition to copper mining and smelting, the region also supported the dairy industry and truck farming. Many immigrants (from Poland, etc.) settled there in the late 19th century 

By 1900, Red Jacket had a population of 4,668, and Calumet Township, which contained Red Jacket and nearby mining towns, had a population of 25,991. However, in 1913, Red Jacket suffered from the Copper Country Strike of 1913–1914, and the population began to decline. In the same year, the town was the site of the Italian Hall Disaster. Striking miners and their families were gathered on Christmas Eve for a party in Italian Hall, when the cry of "fire" precipitated a stampede that crushed or suffocated seventy-three victims, the majority of them children. The identity of the person(s) who started the stampede has never been determined. Folk singer Woody Guthrie's song, "1913 Massacre", is based on this event.

Loss of wartime demand caused the copper price to drop following World War I. With the decreased demand for copper, thousands left Red Jacket in the 1920s, many moving to Detroit, Michigan, where the automobile industry was booming.

During the Great Depression, almost all mines were shut down. As a result, many miners and their families left to find work. In 1950, the population of Calumet was 1,256 people. Small-time mining continued in the area, particularly during World War II, until it was shut down completely by a labor strike in 1968.

In 1984, Calumet's name was borrowed by Hollywood. Calumet was moved from Michigan to Colorado, where it was invaded by Soviet paratroopers in the original Red Dawn film.  Producer and screenwriter Kevin Reynolds was seasonal resident in the Keweenaw Peninsula.

Geography

Large portions of the Keweenaw National Historical Park are located inside the village limits, mostly covering the intricate complex of the Calumet and Hecla Mining Company's main operations.

Transportation

Airport
Houghton County Memorial Airport (KCMX), largely in nearby Oneco, serves Calumet, Houghton County and the surrounding communities.

Bus 
Indian Trails used to operate a route connecting Calumet and Milwaukee.

Train 
Calumet was host to a number of railroad routes, including:

 The Copper Range Railroad traveled through Calumet and continued northeast to the stamp mills at Gay.
 The Hecla & Torch Lake Railroad, which carried ore from the mines in the village off to the stamp mills in Lake Linden.
 The Mineral Range Railroad also operated here.

People and culture

Food
One of the biggest parts of the food culture of not only Calumet, but the entire Copper Country, is the pasty. This was a main part of copper miners' diets. A pasty is a mixture of meat, potatoes, rutabaga, carrots and onions wrapped in a crust made of flour and lard. Traditionally Cornish, they have even sparked local events such as the Pasty Fest, where there are eating contests (with consumption of pasties, of course), games, events, and even a tug of war event where the losers take a dive into an inflatable pool filled with ketchup.

Theatre

The Calumet Theatre is a theater and opera house which opened in 1900. In 1898, the copper mining industry was booming, and the town had an enormous surplus in its treasury. The town council decided to spend some of the surplus on a theater. The theater hosted a large number of famous actors, musicians, and opera singers. With the closing of the mines, the theater became a movie theater and fell into general disrepair for many years. In 1975, the town began a large project to repair and restore the theater, which is now used for many local and touring productions. The theatre was added to the National Register of Historic Places on August 5, 1971, and is also a Michigan State Historic Site. The Theatre was the original recording venue of the Red Jacket Jamboree, an old-time radio variety show heard on Michigan public radio stations including Interlochen Public Radio and WNMU Public Radio 90.

Summer activities
Every two years there is an all-school reunion for the graduates of Calumet High School. Many activities occur at this time, including a classic car show and parade.

Pasty Fest is a one-day event that takes place every summer downtown Calumet. The event celebrates the pasty, which was brought over by Cornish miners in the mid 1800s. The meat and vegetable "pie" became a staple for miners throughout the Upper Peninsula. The event includes a parade, street fair, live music, a pasty eating contest and a competition among restaurants for the best pasty.

Churches

St. Paul the Apostle Church

St. Paul the Apostle Church, formerly known as St. Joseph's Catholic Church, was formed in 1889 by Slovenian immigrants who came to the Calumet area to work in the booming copper mines. The first church that they built burnt down in 1902, but the church was rebuilt in sandstone by 1908. The church "rises authoritatively over the village like a cathedral of medieval Europe." When the church was completed, the cost of construction was an amazing $100,000. It is constructed of local Jacobsville sandstone, and features beautiful stained glass windows, a custom-built 19’ by 18’ pipe organ, and a beautifully painted interior. The interior of the church remains virtually unchanged architecturally.  In 1966, four of the five Catholic churches in the Calumet area were forced to merge because of the low number of parishioners and economic constraints. This included St. Anne's (the French church), St. John's (the Croatian church), St. Mary's (the Italian church), and St. Joseph's. The combined parish is housed in the old St. Joseph's building, and has changed its name to St. Paul the Apostle Church. Today, they have a large and active congregation, which pays for the upkeep of the church.

Protestant churches
The city, at one time, Calumet had six active Lutheran churches (two of which were Laestadian), three Methodist churches, as well as an Episcopal, Congregationalist, Baptist and Presbyterian church.

Today, only one Lutheran, Baptist, Methodist, and Episcopal church remain open. Additionally, another Baptist church has opened. Two of the former Lutheran churches and the Presbyterian church are still standing today but are not in use.

Demographics

2010 census
As of the census of 2010, there were 726 people, 376 households, and 161 families residing in the village. The racial makeup of the village was 96.8% White, 0.4% African American, 0.4% Native American, 0.3% Asian, 0.3% from other races, and 1.8% from two or more races. Hispanic or Latino of any race were 2.5% of the population.

There were 376 households, out of which 21.5% had children under the age of 18 living with them, 23.4% were married couples living together, 14.6% had a female householder with no husband present, 4.8% had a male householder with no wife present, and 57.2% were non-families. 48.9% of all households were made up of individuals, and 20.5% had someone living alone who was 65 years of age or older. The average household size was 1.93 and the average family size was 2.78.

The median age in the village was 40.4 years. 20.4% of residents were under the age of 18; 11.4% were between the ages of 18 and 24; 22.5% were from 25 to 44; 27.6% were from 45 to 64; and 18.2% were 65 years of age or older. The gender makeup of the village was 49.3% male and 50.7% female.

2000 census
As of the census of 2000, there were 879 people, 387 households, and 136 families residing in the village. The racial makeup of the village was 98.98% White, 0.23% from other races, and 0.80% from two or more races. 0.80% of the population were Hispanic or Latino of any race. 35.7% were of Finnish, 10.3% German, 9.3% Irish, 7.1% United States or American, 7.0% French and 6.5% Italian ancestry according to Census 2000. 95.7% spoke English, 3.0% Spanish and 1.2% Finnish as their first language.

There were 387 households, out of which 20.2% had children under the age of 18 living with them, 19.9% were married couples living together, 12.4% had a female householder with no husband present, and 64.6% were non-families. 58.1% of all households were made up of individuals, and 25.8% had someone living alone who was 65 years of age or older. The average household size was 1.85 and the average family size was 3.12.

In the village, the population was spread out, with 20.0% under the age of 18, 24.8% from 18 to 24, 21.8% from 25 to 44, 15.8% from 45 to 64, and 17.5% who were 65 years of age or older. The median age was 29 years. For every 100 females, there were 95.8 males. For every 100 females age 18 and over, there were 91.6 males.

The median income for a household in the village was $17,404, and the median income for a family was $22,750. Males had a median income of $21,667 versus $18,125 for females. The per capita income for the village was $12,111. About 29.0% of families and 35.0% of the population were below the poverty line, including 50.5% of those under age 18 and 18.9% of those age 65 or over.

Attractions 
Some of the notable attractions in the village include:

 The Calumet Theatre, which opened in 1900, is the first municipality built opera house in the United States.
The Copper Country Associated Artists (CCAA), founded in the 1960s, is a regional art organization that operates a gallery and workshop in Calumet.
 The old 1898 Red Jacket Fire Hall on 6th Street is a Keweenaw Heritage Site and is listed on the National Register of Historic Places. It was built using Jacobsville Sandstone from the Keweenaw Bay. Today it houses the Copper Country Firefighters Museum.
The Calumet and Hecla Library at 101 Red Jacket Avenue was said to contain more volumes in its collection than the entire Michigan State Library.
 The Keweenaw National Historical Park Visitor Center offers three story exhibits relating to the village's copper mining history. The museum is operated by the Keweenaw National Historical Park and is free to the public.
The Keweenaw Storytelling Center operated by the nonprofit Real People Media, Inc.  The Center is located in a historic Woolworth's building within the Calumet Historic District and features a visual exhibit area, puppet theatre, and 100 seat theatre space for storytelling events. The venue is the headquarters of The Red Jacket Jamboree, old-time radio variety show broadcast on Public Radio Networks and distributed via PRX Radio Exchange.  
The Calumet Historic District is listed as both a National Historic Landmark District of the United States, and is also on the National Register of Historic Places.
 The Calumet Colosseum is the town's main ice arena as well as North America's Oldest Indoor Ice Rink.

Notable people
Hunk Anderson, head football coach of Notre Dame and Chicago Bears
Rip Bachor, American football player
Carmen L. Browne, author and illustrator
Bill Burich, Major League Baseball player for the Philadelphia Phillies
Ferdinand J. Chesarek, United States Army general during the Second world war and Purple Heart recipient
Anna Clemenc, (AKA "Big Annie") labour activist and regional heroine
Brian Despain, American artist associated with Dungeons & Dragons
John Entenza, American architect known for his modernist designs
Jeff Finger, professional ice hockey player who resides in Calumet during the summertime
Norm Harvey, football player
Bill Ivey, former chairman of Country Music Hall of Fame and National Endowment of the Arts
Fred Larson, American football player
Jack Lester, heavyweight boxer
Allan MacRae, theologian and co-founder of the Biblical Theological Seminary in Hatfield, Pennsylvania
Russ McLeod, American football player
Stanley Muirhead, American football player
Joseph G. Pinten, Catholic bishop of Superior, Wisconsin
Jack Real, aerospace pioneer and associate of Howard Hughes
Paul D. Rogers, U.S. Army Major general and Michigan's 34th State adjutant general
Percy Ross, self-made multi-millionaire
John Sherf, 1st US-born Stanley Cup Champion
Albert Joseph Smith, American marine and Medal of Honor recipient
Paul J. Smith, music composer; wrote compositions for Disney
James Tolkan, actor, known for his roles in films Back to the Future and Top Gun
Charlie Uksila, professional hockey player
Dominic Vairo, American football player for the Green Bay Packers
Rudy Zunich, ice hockey player

Gallery

References

External links

Calumet Public Schools

Company towns in Michigan
Houghton micropolitan area, Michigan
Villages in Houghton County, Michigan
Populated places established in 1864
1929 establishments in Michigan